Tanisha Lynn Eanes, known professionally as Tanisha Lynn (born September 14, 1978 in Houston, Texas) is an American actress.

Brief biography
Lynn is best known for her portrayal of Danielle Frye, the daughter of Derek Frye (formerly William Christian and currently Charles Parnell) and Mimi Reed (Shari Headley), a role which she played from March 2004 until January 2007 on the show All My Children. Although rumors about Lynn's status with the show were circulating for some time, due to her lack of storyline, it was reported at Pine Valley Bulletin: Ins and Outs in January 2007 that Lynn had taped her final scenes in December 2006, last to air in late January.  She graduated from the Theatre Department at the High School for the Performing and Visual Arts in Houston and went on to the Tisch School of the Arts at NYU.

Her other appearances include:
 Robot Stories
 Law & Order: Special Victims Unit
 My Wife and Kids
 As Audrey in Shakespeare's As You Like It at Worth Street Theater Company.

Filmography

Film

Television

Personal life
Lynn parents are William Eanes and Brenda Davis. She has two siblings: Kenneth Davis and Brent Eanes, now she makes guest appearances in Tyler Perry's hit series on TBS called Tyler Perry's House of Payne, 2010 season.

External links
 
 Tanisha Lynn Official Website
 SoapCentral profile

1978 births
Living people
Actresses from Houston
Tisch School of the Arts alumni
21st-century American actresses
American television actresses
African-American actresses
American film actresses
American stage actresses
American soap opera actresses